Diamond (Kent Chang) is a fictional character, a superhero appearing in American comic books published by Marvel Comics. The character appears in the  NEW-GEN comic books. Created by Chris Matonti, J.D. Matonti, and Julia Coppola, he first appeared in NEW-GEN #1 (2010). He was one of the children from the world of NEW-GEN granted extraordinary abilities by Deadalus' nanobot plague. He is a founding member of the A.P.N.G.

Fictional character biography

Early life
Diamond was born on New-Gen, and was only a few years old when Deadalus went rogue and released an enormous quantity of nanobots on the population. He was one of the children upon whom the nanobots had a drastic, mutating effect. After his skin hardened into the crystalline substance of which it is currently made, Gabriel adopted the young Diamond in order to train him in the proper use of his powers.

Training with A.P.N.G.
During his years of schooling, presided over by Gabriel and his wife, Thea, Diamond became an exceptionally hard and disciplined worker. He took his martial arts training especially seriously. Diamond became a bit of a perfectionist in the eyes of his teammates as he matured. He regularly took place in combat and tactical training exercises, as well as standard schooling in various academic fields of study.

Battle with Sly
When Sly burrowed his way through the crust of the underworld onto Zadaar IV with his army of MetalMites and microbots, Diamond was part of the team sent to dispatch him, after Sly's forces proved too powerful for Mini to handle by himself. Diamond, although relatively new to legitimate battle, destroyed a large number of MetalMites on his own. He also allowed himself to be used as a tactical projectile, due to his nigh-indestructible skin. Both Gazelle, her super speed, and Flyer, using his ability to gain tremendous altitude, throw Diamond into very large MetalMites, punching large holes through them and rendering them useless. Sly then uses a specialized energy blast and deactivates the nanobots inside the A.P.N.G. This causes Diamond to revert to his original human form, leaving him powerless and in pain. When Gabriel arrives, he gives each member of the A.P.N.G. a nano-glove, containing nanobots which restore their powers and strength. As Gabriel fights Sly, Diamond's confidence is renewed, and he destroys several more MetalMites with his teammates, eventually emerging victorious and returning home to New-Gen.

Powers, abilities, and equipment
Diamond's entire body is composed of a substance very similar to (and possibly stronger than) terrestrial diamonds. It is light blue in color, and almost translucent. Its unique strength and durability make Diamond almost invulnerable to injury. It is common for other members of the A.P.N.G. to throw him at larger foes, as his density and invulnerability ensures that he will do maximum damage and will incur minimal harm upon himself. This technique is reminiscent of the fastball special. Diamond also seems to possess a limited degree of super strength, as he is able to destabilize larger, dense foes with his attacks. Although the ability is only seen in one panel in NEW-GEN #5, Diamond appears to be able to slightly change his shape when angered, generating sharp protrusions from his body to inflict more damage. Whether or not this ability will further manifest itself remains to be seen.

In addition to his powers, Diamond is also a highly skilled martial artist, with an advanced knowledge of many fighting styles. Gabriel has outfitted him, as well as Mini (the two members of the A.P.N.G. unable to travel at faster than normal speeds) with a sort of wrist mounted grappling hook, similar to those used by Batman or Black Cat (comics).

References

External links 
 http://www.comicvine.com/diamond/29-74321/

Fictional characters with superhuman durability or invulnerability
Marvel Comics characters with superhuman strength
Marvel Comics martial artists